Revenge at Monte Carlo is a 1933 American pre-Code mystery film directed by B. Reeves Eason and starring June Collyer, José Crespo and Wheeler Oakman. It is also known by the alternative title of Mystery at Monte Carlo.

The film's sets were designed by the art director Paul Palmentola. A separate Spanish-language version Dos noches was also produced.

Cast
 June Collyer as Landra 
 José Crespo as Boris Krinsky 
 Wheeler Oakman as Spike Maguire 
 Dorothy Gulliver as Diane 
 Edward Earle as Francisco Hernandez 
 Lloyd Ingraham as Luis del Valle 
 Clarence Geldart as Mendez 
 Lloyd Whitlock as Alba

References

Bibliography
 Michael R. Pitts. Poverty Row Studios, 1929–1940: An Illustrated History of 55 Independent Film Companies, with a Filmography for Each. McFarland & Company, 2005.

External links
 

1933 films
1933 mystery films
American mystery films
Films directed by B. Reeves Eason
Films set in Monaco
Mayfair Pictures films
1930s English-language films
1930s American films